Yarbaşı is a Turkish place name that may refer to the following places in Turkey:

 Yarbaşı, Gölbaşı, a village in the district of Gölbaşı, Adıyaman Province
 Yarbaşı, Vezirköprü, a village in the district of Vezirköprü, Samsun Province
 Yarbaşı, Düziçi, a town in the district of Düziçi, Osmaniye Province
 Yarbaşı, Oltu
 Yarbaşı, Yusufeli, a village in the district of Yusufeli, Artvin Province

See also
 Yarbaşıçandırı, Konyaaltı, a village in the district of Antalya, Antalya Province